Dishevelled binding antagonist of beta catenin 1 (Dact1, previously known as Dapper, Dpr1, Frodo) is a protein that in humans is encoded by the DACT1 gene.  Dact1 was originally described in 2002 as a negative regulator of Wnt signaling by binding and destabilizing Dishevelled. More recent investigation into the molecular function of Dact1 has identified its principle role in the cell as a scaffold to generate membrane-less biomolecular condensates through liquid-liquid phase separation. Mutations in the phase-separating regions of Dact1 lead to Townes-Brock Syndrome 2 while its overexpression is associated with bone metastasis.

Regulation and function 

Dact1 is regulated by the TGF-β pathway through Smad2/3 binding sites in its promoter region. Dact1 is degraded through the proteasome and is described as a Wnt activator, a Wnt suppressor, or alternately a Wnt-independent regulator of the autophagosome. The Dact1 protein is annotated with 10 intrinsically disordered domains, a nuclear localization sequence, a nuclear export sequence, a PDZ binding domain, and a coiled-coiled domain. AI-based protein folding predictions describe a highly disordered exterior calyx surrounding an ordered interior. Dact1 has been reported to interact with numerous proteins including itself, Dishevelled, p120, LEF, 14-3-3 proteins, VPS34, Miz1, Vangl, and Dact2 through immunoprecipitation studies. More recent studies into the role of Dact1 in forming "Frodosomes", or membrane-less, organelle-like biomolecular condensates, identified a Dact1 protein signature that included many previously identified interactors as well as new proteins such as Casein Kinase 2.

Health and disease 
Dact1 is an essential regulator of development through its role in regulating Wnt activity and its deletion is embryonically lethal. Heterozygous mutations in Dact1 cause Townes-Brock Syndrome 2 in humans which is inherited in an autosomal dominant pattern. High levels of Dact1 mRNA predicts worse outcome in breast cancer bone metastasis and is an essential protein in the bone metastatic cascade.

References 

Genetics
Proteins